Poonjar State assembly constituency is one of the 140 state legislative assembly constituencies at the state Kerala in southern India. It is also one of the 7 state legislative assembly constituencies included in the Pathanamthitta Lok Sabha constituency. As of the 2021 assembly elections, the current MLA is Sebastian Kulathunkal of KC(M).

Local self governed segments
Poonjar Niyama Sabha constituency is composed of the following local self governed segments:

Members of Legislative Assembly 
The following list contains all members of Kerala legislative assembly who have represented the constituency:

Key

Election results

Niyamasabha Election 2021

There were 1,89,091registered voters in the constituency for the 2021 election.

Niyamasabha Election 2016 
There were 1,83,590 registered voters in the constituency for the 2016 Kerala Niyamasabha Election.

Niyamasabha Election 2011 
There were 1,67,928 registered voters in the constituency for the 2011 election.

See also
 Poonjar
 Kottayam district
 List of constituencies of the Kerala Legislative Assembly
 2016 Kerala Legislative Assembly election

References 

Assembly constituencies of Kerala

State assembly constituencies in Kottayam district